Tetradymia comosa is a species of flowering plant in the aster family, known by the common name hairy horsebrush.

Distribution
The plant is native to the Transverse Ranges and Peninsular Ranges in Southern California and northern Baja California.  It grows in local chaparral and woodlands habitats, such as coastal sage scrub and montane chaparral and woodlands.

Description
The leaves are lance-shaped and up to 6 centimeters long, becoming rigid as they age, sometimes with their tips hardening to spines.

The inflorescence bears three to six flower heads which are each enveloped in five or six thick phyllaries coated in white woolly hairs. Each head contains five to nine yellow or brownish flowers each around a centimeter long.

The fruit is a small, hairy achene.

References

External links

Jepson Manual Treatment: Tetradymia comosa
Flora of North America
Tetradymia comosa — U.C. Photo gallery

Senecioneae
Flora of Baja California
Flora of California
Natural history of the California chaparral and woodlands
Natural history of the Peninsular Ranges
Natural history of the Transverse Ranges
Flora without expected TNC conservation status